Helmut Marko (born 27 April 1943) is an Austrian former professional racing driver and current advisor to the Red Bull GmbH Formula One teams, and head of Red Bull's driver development program.

Biography
Marko was born in Graz, Austria. He was a school friend of Jochen Rindt, who became Formula One world champion in 1970. Marko competed in several race series, including 10 Formula One Grands Prix in 1971 and 1972, but scored no World Championship points.

He had more success in endurance racing, winning the 1971 24 Hours of Le Mans, driving a Martini-Porsche 917K with Gijs van Lennep. During that year, they set a distance record which remained unbeaten until the 2010 24 Hours of Le Mans (5,335.313 km, at an average of 222.304 km/h). (Changes to the track reduced the average speed.)

At the Targa Florio, he drove the fastest laps around the 72 km Sicilian mountain circuit in the 1972 race, catching up over two minutes on the leader within two laps to finish second by a mere 17 seconds. His fastest lap in the Alfa Romeo 33 was 33 min 41 sec, at an average of 128.253 km/h.

A few weeks later, during the 1972 French Grand Prix at Clermont-Ferrand, a stone thrown up by Ronnie Peterson's March pierced Marko's helmet visor, permanently blinding his left eye and ending his racing career.
Marko completed a doctorate in law in 1967. He owns two hotels in Graz – the Schlossberghotel and Augartenhotel. He was manager for Austrian racing drivers Gerhard Berger and Karl Wendlinger for some years before setting up and running RSM Marko in 1989, a race team competing in Formula 3 and Formula 3000; running under the name Red Bull Junior Team from 1999 onwards. From 1999 he has also overseen the Red Bull driver development programme, which has steered drivers such as Sebastian Vettel, Daniel Ricciardo, Carlos Sainz Jr. and Max Verstappen into Formula One. Since 2005 he has been advisor to the Red Bull Racing Formula One team and since 2006 he has also advised the Scuderia Toro Rosso, now Scuderia AlphaTauri Formula One team.

Racing record

24 Hours of Le Mans results

Complete British Saloon Car Championship results
(key) (Races in bold indicate pole position; races in italics indicate fastest lap.)

Complete European Formula Two Championship results
(key)

Complete Formula One World Championship results
(key)

References

Notes

External links
Profile at grandprix.com

1943 births
Living people
Sportspeople from Graz
24 Hours of Le Mans drivers
24 Hours of Le Mans winning drivers
Austrian Formula One drivers
Austrian motorsport people
Austrian racing drivers
BRM Formula One drivers
Ecurie Bonnier Formula One drivers
European Formula Two Championship drivers
Red Bull Racing
World Sportscar Championship drivers
Scuderia Toro Rosso
Porsche Motorsports drivers